Mr.Shubhendra Rao is a composer and sitar player who's ranked amongst the top soloists of India. The press describes him as "a musical bridge to many cultures" and "a thinking musician, constantly endeavouring to carry his instrument beyond conventional boundaries". His music is "an experience that is not aimed at titillating the senses, but to seize the soul".

A protege of Ravi Shankar, he is acknowledged by critics and connoisseurs alike as a worthy successor to his teacher's tradition.

He is a classical musician, as well as a collaborator, working with musicians from different genres across the world. He has performed at prestigious venues and festivals like the Kennedy Center, Carnegie Hall, Broadway, the Sydney Opera House, the National Arts Festival, the Theatre de la Ville, Dover Lane Music Conference, and St. Xavier's college Ahmedabad to name a few.

Early life
Shubhendra Rao was born on 26 November 1964 in Mysore city in the state of Karnataka in Southern India. From a very young age, he showed great talent for music. His father, N R Rama Rao (who was one of the earliest and closest disciples of Ravi Shankar), initiated him into the intricacies of the sitar. His mother, Nagaratna, is a trained Saraswati Veena player.His sister, Mrs.Sadhana Jayaram, also plays the Sitar and is now currently teaching students at Sathya Sai Loka Seva Institutions, Muddenahalli.

At the age of seven he took his first lesson from the master  Ravi Shankar and continued to visit Shankar in different cities in India to pursue his musical education. The year 1984 was a milestone year in his life. At the insistence of his teacher, Shubhendra moved to Delhi to live with and learn from him in the true guru-shishya tradition. The years that followed were a period of introspective and creative metamorphosis. He tried to build in a discipline within himself, practicing from anything between ten and twelve hours every day. His teacher nurtured his talent, giving him deep insights into what it entailed to become a complete artist.

Performing with and assisting Ravi Shankar
An important part of his learning was assisting his teacher in solo concerts and orchestras. As an 18-year-old in 1983, he performed on stage for the first time with his Guru in ‘Uday Utsav’ in New Delhi. In 1988, he assisted and performed in the orchestra ‘Live in Kremlin’ in Russia that has been released as a CD. In 1989 and 1990, he toured with the production ‘Ghanashyam’ in the UK and India. His first concert assisting Shankar in his solo concert was in February 1985 in New Delhi. Between 1985 and 1995, he performed with Shankar at numerous concerts all over the world, continuing to assist him in all his creative productions.

Career
In 1987 Shubhendra gave his first solo concert in Bangalore, and since then has gone on to establish himself as one of the distinguished instrumentalists of his generation. Shubhendra has performed at some of the most prestigious venues like Carnegie Hall and on Broadway in New York, John F. Kennedy Center for Performing Arts in Washington DC, Walker Arts Center in Minneapolis, Des Moines Arts Center, Maui Arts and Cultural Center in Hawaii, Sydney Opera House in Sydney, Edinburgh Festivals in Scotland, at the Theatre de la Ville in Paris, WOMAD festival in Guernsey England, National Arts Festival in South Africa, Fajr International Music Festival in Tehran, Esplanade in Singapore among others. In India, Shubhendra has performed at major music festivals including Dover Lane Music Conference, the ITC Music Conference in Kolkata, Baba Harballabh Sangeet Mahasabha in Jullundhar, Shankarlal Festival and Gunidas Sammelan in New Delhi, SAPTAK Festival in Ahmedabad, and Vasantahabba Festival in Bangalore.

A regular performer on Radio and the National Television, he holds a ‘Grade A’ status on the All India Radio roster. He is impaneled by the Indian Council for Cultural Relations (ICCR) both as a performer as well as a Guru.

He has also been invited as a guest teacher to give 'lecture-demonstrations' about Indian music by leading universities all over the world. Some universities include Peabody Conservatory of Music, Duke University, Yale University, University of Sacramento, Lewis and Clark College, University of Minneapolis, Winona State University, University of Nebraska.

In November 2007, he was awarded the "Youth Icon for Classical Music" by India's popular Zee Television Network.
Shubhendra Rao & Saskia Rao were also honoured with the "Delhi Ratna" award by the Art and Cultural Trust of India in December 2014.

Collaborations
An ardent and enthusiastic collaborator, Shubhendra has worked with musicians across genres. Some of the wonderful musicians he has composed for and collaborated with include Pipa Master, Ms. Gao Hong, Jazz Guitarist Nguyen Le from Paris, Jazz guitarist, Freddie Bryant from New York, legendary singer Ryoko Moriyama from Japan, Jazz flautist James Newton. He has also worked with Iranian musicians, Ciavash Borhani on Taar and Samer Habibi on Kamancha.

The press has hailed his collaborative work with his Dutch Cellist wife, Saskia Rao-de Haas as taking Indian music into a brave, new era.

Compositions
 In August 2008, India's premier Television Network, NDTV commissioned Shubhendra and Saskia to compose and perform a musical tribute to celebrate India's 61st Independence Day. This celebration had more than 90,000 hits on MSN India in just three days.
 Composed for the production, "From Temple to Theatre", Minneapolis based Ragamala Dance production.
 Composed the music with Saskia Rao-de Haas for "When Gods meet", Padma Vibhushan Dr. Sonal Mansingh's production.
 For the 50th anniversary of the Spanish founder Father Vicente Ferrer in 2009, Shubhendra and Saskia composed a vibrant piece in the presence of the Spanish vice-president, illustrating the connection between his land of birth and India.
 "Yathra" which means 'journey' is the title of a composition that they created for Ragamala Dance, Minneapolis, US in 2008 and 2011. Yathra evokes an abstract expression of the cycle of life in a day, metaphorically tracing a human being's journey from the dawn of birth to the twilight of life.
 "The Red Flower" (2011) is a musical dialogue based on the conversation that took place between Rabindranath Tagore and Albert Einstein regarding the perception of music by different individuals. It was through a fine weave of two seemingly different paradigms of culture and music that Shubhendra and Saskia chose to present this innovative concept.
 "Vesaal" (2011) is the collaboration between Shubhendra and Saskia with the Iranian musicians Ciavash Borhani on Tar, Samir Habibi on Kemanche and Fakkhrudin Ghaffari on Tombak, Duf exploring the cross points of Indian and Persian Classical music. 
 "Unity of Faith" is a work commissioned in 2008 in honour of the international conference by the same name. Shubhendra and Saskia composed music to prayers and spiritual texts from different religions showing the effect that music can have on any seeker of spiritual enlightenment from any background bringing together a world music ensemble.

Discography
 Fulfilment—Solo recording of Raga Lalit and Raga Maru Bihag. 
 Raga Marwa—Released by India Music Archives, New York 
 Journey Together—Duet with Sarod player Partho Sarathy—Raga Patdeep and Raga Charukesi. 
 Creating Waves—Duet with Saskia Rao-de Haas released by Rhyme Records, Kansas City 
 Ancient Weaves—Duet with Sarod player, Partho Sarathy—Raga Charukauns and Raga Manj Khamaj 
 New Offerings of Ravi Shankar—recorded Raga Tilak Shyam with his Guru, Pandit Ravi Shankar in 1983. 
 Flying Dragon—Composed and performed with Pipa maestro, Gao Hong.

Teacher
As someone who is amongst the last of his generation learning under the age-old 'Guru-Shishya parampara', Shubhendra continues to teach those who seek him out. As an impaneled Guru of the Indian Council for Cultural Relations, many students from all over the world learn from him. Some of them stay for 6–8 years at a stretch, some spend a few months every year with him and others continue to learn from him all year round.

Shubhendra and Saskia Rao Foundation
The Shubhendra & Saskia Rao Foundation is a nonprofit organization that stands for Music every child's birthright! The Foundation is a way to help under privileged children to realize their full potential through music.

They have introduced a new approach to music education in their specially developed curriculum for India: ‘Music4All: a Glocalizedmusic education to empower youth’. The Foundation is currently working with over 150 school children from the Nizamuddin Basti to empower them through music, conducts outreach programs for adults, teacher trainings and organizes random music events and concerts throughout the city.

Personal life
Shubhendra Rao married Saskia Rao-de Haas on 3 February 2001. They are blessed with a son, Ishaan who is learning the Piano and Sitar, showing signs of the genes he has inherited.

References

External links
 Shubhendra Rao official site
 Shubhendra Rao Linkedin Profile
 Shubhendra Rao Facebook
 Shubhendra & Saskia Rao Foundation, www.music4all.org, a music education initiative for under privileged children.
 SPICMACAY Chapter in UK

Hindustani instrumentalists
Living people
1964 births
Musicians from Mysore
Sitar players
20th-century Indian male classical singers